The Pittsburgh Curling Club (or PghCC) is a curling club located in Pittsburgh, Pennsylvania.  The PghCC was founded in 2002 with 12 members, and as of 2020 has over 100 members.

The club opened its new four sheet dedicated ice facility in Stowe Township in February 2020.

Facility

The PghCC operates at 491 McCoy Road, Pittsburgh, PA. 15136

Origin

The Pittsburgh Curling Club was founded in May 2002, after months of emails and discussions between several ex-pat Canadians and local Pittsburgh residents. The twelve founding members rented ice for 26 weeks at Robert Morris University (RMU) Island Sports Center to start offering Learn-to-Curl sessions. Initially, the members had to draw the curling sheet lines and circles by hand prior to playing their games.

In 2007, the Pittsburgh Curling Club received its 501(c)(3) status as a charitable organization. The mission of the club is:

 ... to teach, develop, promote and encourage the sport of Curling; to develop youth and adult programs that lead to local, national and international competition; to coordinate and develop interscholastic competition; and to teach the sport to youth organizations as well as to interested adults by creating public awareness and appreciation for the sport.

Bonspiels

The Bonspiel schedule for 2020 is to be determined.

The Pittsburgh Curling Club hosted an annual summer bonspiel. from 2006 - 2017.

TropiCurl: held in early July, was an "open" format bonspiel (for teams made up of any combination of men, women, and juniors) that drew curlers from all over the United States and Canada.

TropiCurl
TropiCurl was held around the July 4th weekend.

Past TropiCurl winners
2017: Da Beers, (Chicago CC / Pittsburgh CC) Skip: Colin Rittgers, Vice: Michelle Rittgers, 2nd: Aaron Horowitz, Lead: Neill Turner 
2016: Team Couch, (Potomac CC, Laurel MD / Columbus CC, Columbus OH / Mayfield CC, Cleveland OH),  Skip: Melvin Shaw, Vice: Courtney Shaw, 2nd: Eric Johnson, Lead: Julia DiBaggio
2015: Draw the Four, (Glendale Curling Club – Ontario) Skip: Simon Ouellet, Vice: Danielle Breedon, 2nd: Todd Breedon, Lead: Betty Calic
2014: Team Scott, (Hamilton Victoria)   Skip: John Scott, Vice: Judy Scott, 2nd: Jim Neales, Lead: Christina Neales
2013: Team Miller, (St. Georges) Skip: J. Miller, Vice: L. Berwick, 2nd: M. Berwick, Lead: S. Penton
2012: Team Burchesky, (New Pond Curling Club) Skip: D. Burchesky, Vice: S. Burchesky, 2nd: J. Burchesky, Lead: J. Burchesky 
2011: Team Murray, (Potomac Curling Club, Laurel, MD) Skip. Sean Murray Vice, Nick Datlowe 2nd, Jeremy Vanderhouten Lead, Melissa Fox
2010: Team Murray, (Potomac Curling Club, Laurel, MD)  Skip: Sean Murray, Vice: Nick Datlowe, 2nd: Jeremy Vanderhouten, Lead: Melissa Fox
2009: Team Moretto, Richmond Hill Curling Club  Skip: D. Moretto, Vice: B. Gillispie, 2nd: P. DiClemente, Lead: B. Woolnough
2008: Team Epping, Tam Heather Curling Club  Skip: J. Epping, Vice: K. Smith, 2nd: S. Smith, Lead: S. Collins
2007: Team Durrant, Plainfield Curling Club  Skip: D. Durrant, Vice: A. Dubberly, 2nd: M. Dubberly, Lead: B. Peskoff
2006: Team Inglis, (Brampton Curling Club) Skip: Danielle Inglis,  Vice: Jeff Inglis,  2nd: Mark Inglis, Lead: Lori Inglis

Affiliations

Grand National Curling Club
United States Curling Association
United States Women's Curling Association
World Curling Federation

References

External links
Pittsburgh Curling Club Website
Pittsburgh Curling Club at USCA website

Curling clubs in the United States
Sports in Pittsburgh
Curling clubs established in 2002
2002 establishments in Pennsylvania
Curling in Pennsylvania